Ligat HaAl (lit., Supreme League or Premier League), or the Israeli Basketball Premier League, is the top-tier level league of professional competition in Israeli club basketball, making it Israel's primary basketball competition. The league's name is abbreviated as either BSL (Basketball Super League) or ISBL (Israeli Basketball Super League). For sponsorship reasons, the league is also referred to as Ligat Winner Sal, lit. Winner Basket League, with "Winner" being the name of a game operated by the league's primary sponsor, Toto Winner.

The league is run by the Israeli Basketball Super League Administration Ltd.

Overview
Ligat HaAl comprises the top 12 basketball clubs in Israel, and was founded in 1954.

The league itself is most known in Europe, due to the success of the Israeli teams in European-wide competitions, such as the EuroLeague, EuroCup (formerly called the ULEB Cup), and FIBA's EuroChallenge (formerly called the FIBA EuroCup). Many non-drafted and free agent players from Europe and the NBA play in the Israeli league, as an alternative to NBA competition.

The league is the first division in Israeli basketball: the team that finishes last in a season is relegated to the Second Division, while the Second Division's top 8 teams compete in a play-off system right after the end of the regular season, with the team that reaches the finals series being promoted to the Premier League for the following season.

Format

There are 12 teams in the league, and they play against each other thrice. The top eight teams advance to the five-game series Quarter-finals. The winners of the Quarter-finals advance to the Final Four.

Links with the NBA

During the 1980s and the early 1990s there were many basketball games between the Israeli League stars and NBA teams such as the Phoenix Suns, the Cleveland Cavaliers, the Orlando Magic, and the Los Angeles Lakers, all of which were played in Israel.

In October 2005, Maccabi Tel Aviv defeated the Toronto Raptors 105–103 in an exhibition game that was played in Toronto, Canada; this was the first victory for any European or Israeli team over an NBA team at its home court.

Over the years, the league has exported many of its foreign players to the NBA. In 2009, Omri Casspi became the first Israeli-born NBA player with the Sacramento Kings.  Prior to that, three players had been drafted: Doron Sheffer (who played U.S. college basketball at Connecticut), Yotam Halperin and Lior Eliyahu. Oded Kattash agreed to play with the New York Knicks, but he never actually played in the NBA because of the 1998–99 NBA lockout that started on July 1, 1998.

In the 2009 NBA Draft, Omri Casspi was selected 23rd overall by the Sacramento Kings, and Gal Mekel followed in 2013 by signing with Dallas Mavericks.  In 2016, Dragan Bender became the highest selection from the Israeli Basketball Premier League to be selected in an NBA draft with the Phoenix Suns taking him at 4th overall. Other players who have moved from the league to the NBA include: Will Bynum, Anthony Parker, Joe Ingles, Roger Mason Jr., P. J. Tucker, Eugene "Pooh" Jeter, Elijah Bryant, Carlos Arroyo, and Nate Robinson.

In 2016, Amar'e Stoudemire retired from the NBA, however on August 1, 2016, he signed a two-year deal with Hapoel Jerusalem, a team he co-owns. On October 1, 2016, he helped Hapoel Jerusalem win the 2016 Israeli Basketball League Cup. He also played for Maccabi Tel Aviv during the 2019-20 season, helping them win the 2019–20 Israeli Basketball Premier League championship. He was named MVP of the championship game.

In 2020 two players declared for the NBA draft. The first being Deni Avdija from Maccabi Tel Aviv and the second being Yam Madar from Hapeol Tel Aviv. Avdija was selected in the first round, 9th overall, by the Washington Wizards, and Madar was taken in the second round with the 47th pick of the draft by the Boston Celtics.

High-profile American Jewish recruits

In 2011, the league imposed a limit of four non-Israelis per team.  Jews are immediately eligible for Israeli citizenship, under Israel's Law of Return.  Consequently, non-Israeli Jewish basketball players are able to join a team in the league without using up one of the few roster spots available for non-Israeli players.

Examples of Jewish Americans joining teams in the league include Jon Scheyer, Jordan Farmar, Sylven Landesberg, David Blu, Amar'e Stoudemire, and Dan Grunfeld.

Current clubs

Titles by team

Title holders 

 1953–54 Maccabi Tel Aviv 
 1954–55 Maccabi Tel Aviv 
 1955–56 ''Not held due to Suez Crisis
 1956–57 Maccabi Tel Aviv 
 1957–58 Maccabi Tel Aviv 
 1958–59 Maccabi Tel Aviv 
 1959–60 Hapoel Tel Aviv 
 1960–61 Hapoel Tel Aviv
 1961–62 Maccabi Tel Aviv 
 1962–63 Maccabi Tel Aviv 
 1963–64 Maccabi Tel Aviv 
 1964–65 Hapoel Tel Aviv 
 1965–66 Hapoel Tel Aviv
 1966–67 Maccabi Tel Aviv 
 1967–68 Maccabi Tel Aviv 
 1968–69 Hapoel Tel Aviv
 1969–70 Maccabi Tel Aviv 
 1970–71 Maccabi Tel Aviv 
 1971–72 Maccabi Tel Aviv 
 1972–73 Maccabi Tel Aviv 
 1973–74 Maccabi Tel Aviv 
 1974–75 Maccabi Tel Aviv 
 1975–76 Maccabi Tel Aviv
 1976–77 Maccabi Tel Aviv 
 1977–78 Maccabi Tel Aviv 
 1978–79 Maccabi Tel Aviv 
 1979–80 Maccabi Tel Aviv 
 1980–81 Maccabi Tel Aviv 
 1981–82 Maccabi Tel Aviv 
 1982–83 Maccabi Tel Aviv 
 1983–84 Maccabi Tel Aviv 
 1984–85 Maccabi Tel Aviv 
 1985–86 Maccabi Tel Aviv 
 1986–87 Maccabi Tel Aviv 
 1987–88 Maccabi Tel Aviv 
 1988–89 Maccabi Tel Aviv 
 1989–90 Maccabi Tel Aviv 
 1990–91 Maccabi Tel Aviv 
 1991–92 Maccabi Tel Aviv 
 1992–93 Hapoel Galil Elyon 
 1993–94 Maccabi Tel Aviv 
 1994–95 Maccabi Tel Aviv 
 1995–96 Maccabi Tel Aviv 
 1996–97 Maccabi Tel Aviv 
 1997–98 Maccabi Tel Aviv 
 1998–99 Maccabi Tel Aviv 
 1999–00 Maccabi Tel Aviv 
 2000–01 Maccabi Tel Aviv 
 2001–02 Maccabi Tel Aviv 
 2002–03 Maccabi Tel Aviv 
 2003–04 Maccabi Tel Aviv 
 2004–05 Maccabi Tel Aviv 
 2005–06 Maccabi Tel Aviv 
 2006–07 Maccabi Tel Aviv 
 2007–08 Hapoel Holon 
 2008–09 Maccabi Tel Aviv 
 2009–10 Hapoel Gilboa Galil
 2010–11 Maccabi Tel Aviv
 2011–12 Maccabi Tel Aviv
 2012–13 Maccabi Haifa
 2013–14 Maccabi Tel Aviv
 2014–15 Hapoel Jerusalem
 2015–16 Maccabi Rishon LeZion
 2016–17 Hapoel Jerusalem
 2017–18 Maccabi Tel Aviv
 2018–19 Maccabi Tel Aviv
 2019–20 Maccabi Tel Aviv
 2020–21 Maccabi Tel Aviv
 2021–22 Hapoel Holon

Finals

Awards

Israeli Basketball Premier League MVP
Israeli Basketball Premier League Finals MVP
Israeli Basketball Premier League Quintet
Israeli Basketball Premier League Defensive Player of the Year
Israeli Basketball Premier League 6th Man of the Year
Israeli Basketball Premier League Most Improved Player
Israeli Basketball Premier League Discovery of the Year
Israeli Basketball Premier League Coach of the Year

Statistical leaders

See also
Israel Basketball Association
Israeli Basketball State Cup
League Cup
Liga Leumit
Basketball in Israel

Notes and references

External links
 Eurobasket.com League Page
 Official website
 IL-Sports Israeli Sport Website in English
  Maccabi Haifa Heat and Maccabi Tel Aviv broadcasts for North America

 
1
1954 establishments in Israel
Professional sports leagues in Israel